The Ghanashyam Hemalata Institute of Technology and Management (GHITM) is a private institute located in outside the city of Puri, in the Indian state of Odisha. GHITM has one school and one college, containing a total of four academic departments. GHITM is affiliated with the Biju Patnaik University of Technology (BPUT). The institute is recognized by the Govt. Of India, approved by the All India Council for Technical Education and affiliated with Biju Patnaik University of Technology.

References

External links
Official G.H.I.T.M Website
G.H.I.T.M Faq

Colleges affiliated with Biju Patnaik University of Technology
Educational institutions established in 1997
All India Council for Technical Education
Private engineering colleges in India
Engineering colleges in Odisha
1997 establishments in Orissa
Education in Cuttack
Puri